The Arthur Kill (sometimes referred to as the Staten Island Sound) is a tidal strait in the New York–New Jersey Harbor Estuary between Staten Island (also known as Richmond County), New York and Union and Middlesex counties, New Jersey. It is a major navigational channel of the Port of New York and New Jersey.

Etymology 
The name  Arthur Kill is an anglicization of  the Dutch language achter kill meaning back channel, which would refer to its location "behind" Staten Island and has its roots in the early 17th century during the Dutch colonial era when the region was part of New Netherland. Placenaming by early explorers and settlers during the era often referred to a location in reference to other places, its shape, its topography, and other geographic qualities. Kill comes from the Middle Dutch word kille, meaning riverbed, water channel, or stream. The area around the Newark Bay was called Achter Kol. During the British colonial era the bay was known as Cull bay. The bay lies behind Bergen Hill, the emerging ridge of the Hudson Palisades which begins on Bergen Neck, the peninsula between it and the Upper New York Bay. The sister channel of Arthur Kill,  Kill van Kull refers to the waterway that flows from the  col or ridge or passage to the interior and translates as channel from the pass or ridge.

Geography and geology

Along the New Jersey side it is primarily lined with industrial sites, part of which is called the Chemical Coast. The Staten Island side is primarily lined with salt marshes and is home to the Staten Island boat graveyard. It creates a border for Fresh Kills Landfill and Freshkills Park.

Course

Arthur Kill is an abandoned river channel carved by an ancestral phase of the Hudson River resulting from the blockage of the main channel of the Hudson at the Narrows by moraine or an ice dam. The size of Arthur Kill channel is large, suggesting that it was, for a time, the primary drainage from the region. However, it could not have been primary drainage for long because the river did not have enough time to carve a broad flood plain.

Because of the complex nature of the tides in New York-New Jersey Harbor Estuary near the mouth of the Hudson River, the hydrology of Arthur Kill is still an open subject. In particular, the net flow of the channel is not well established. It was heavily polluted in the 1960s and 1970s, with few fish species able to live in it. Since the 1990s, crabs, baitfish, striped bass and bluefish have returned to this water.

Tributaries and islands
It contains two small uninhabited islands, Prall's Island and the Isle of Meadows, both of which are part of the borough of Staten Island. John's Cove is located near its northern end in New Jersey.
On the New Jersey side the Elizabeth River, Rahway River, Morses CreekPiles Creek flow into the kill. The  Passaic River and Hackensack River mouth at Newark Bay.
On the Staten Island side Old Place Creek, Fresh Kills (an estuary fed by the Richmond Creek and Main Creek and part of Freshkills Park), Bridge Creek (off Goethal Pond), Old Place Creek, and Sawmill Creek flow into the strait.

Shipping

A heavily used marine channel, it provides access for ocean-going tankers to industrial facilities along the channel itself. The Howland Hook Marine Terminal is located at its mouth at Newark Bay. It provided the primary marine access to the now-closed Fresh Kills Landfill on Staten Island and is the location of the Staten Island boat graveyard. The Arthur Kill Terminal is a proposed offshore wind port.

Crossings

Arthur Kill is spanned by the Goethals Bridge and the Outerbridge Crossing, as well as by the Arthur Kill Vertical Lift Bridge, a railroad bridge and the largest bridge of its type in the United States.

For many years the Kill was traversed by a ferry between Tottenville and the Perth Amboy Ferry Slip.  Another ferry ran from the tip of Victory Boulevard in Travis to Carteret. Re-introduction ferry service between Carteret's Waterfront Park and Midtown Manhattan via Arthur Kill and Kill van Kull is planned. As of 2021, funding for the construction of a landing dock and purchase of a boat was in place.

History
The Arthur Kill was a critical dividing line during the American Revolution, with the British holding Staten Island for the duration of the conflict while New Jersey remained largely in Continental hands. Numerous skirmishes, including the Battle of Staten Island, spanned the Arthur Kill.

The Pilgrim Pipeline, to pipe crude oil, kerosene, and diesel fuel through New York and New Jersey was proposed to terminate at the Linden side of the kill.

See also

Achter Col, New Netherland and Toponymy of New Netherland
List of New Jersey rivers
Lower New York Bay
Hudson Canyon

References

External links

U.S. Army Corps of Engineers Dredging Report, Dec. 2003

Straits of New Jersey
Straits of Richmond County, New York
Borders of New York (state)
Borders of New Jersey
Bodies of water of Middlesex County, New Jersey
Bodies of water of Union County, New Jersey
Port of New York and New Jersey
Bodies of water of Staten Island
Rahway River
Bodies of water in Woodbridge Township, New Jersey